Nùng is a Tai–Kadai language spoken mostly in Cao Bằng and Lạng Sơn provinces in Vietnam and also in China and Laos. It is also known as Nong, Tai Nùng, Tay, and Tày Nùng. Nùng is the name given to the various Tai languages of northern Vietnam that are spoken by peoples classified as Nùng by the Vietnamese government. The Nùng were originally Zhuang people who migrated into Vietnam in the 16th and 18th centuries.

Speakers
In the 1999 census, it had about 856,000 speakers. It had about 968,800 speakers in the 2009 census.

Distribution
In Vietnam, Nùng is spoken in all of the Northeast Region (Except Phu Tho Province) and parts of the South Central Region (Dak Lak, Gia Lai and Lam Dong Provinces).

In China, Nùng is spoken in the Wenshan Prefecture of Yunnan and neighbouring parts of Guangxi. Speakers of the Nùng language in China are classified as Zhuang.

In Laos, Nùng is spoken in three villages of Luang Prabang Province. Speakers are known as the Yang people.

In Laos
The Nùng people of Laos (Yang) believed to originated from a border crossing in Vietnam to Laos from Dien Bien Province to Son La Province and later to Luang Prabang Province. This was during the Vietnam war.

Phonology 
The following are the sounds of the Nùng language:

Consonants

Vowels

Tone 
The Nùng language has six tones:

Varieties
Nùng consists of many varieties, some of which are listed below.

Nùng Phạn Slinh (Nohng Fạn Slihng) is spoken in eastern Lạng Sơn Province. It is spoken by approximately 100,000 people (Freiberger 1976a). Freiberger (1976a) is based on Nùng Phạn Slinh as spoken by refugees from Bắc Giang Province who had moved to Lâm Đồng Province in 1954 (then known as Tuyên Đức Province, which consisted of Đà Lạt, Đơn Dương District, Đức Trọng District, Lạc Dương District). Freiberger (1976) also reported Nùng Phạn Slinh refugees in Biên Hòa Province and Long Khánh Province, which were former administrative divisions in South Vietnam.
Nùng Cháo is spoken around Lạng Sơn city. It is identical with William J. Gedney's Lungchow.
Nùng Inh is spoken in western Lạng Sơn Province. It is identical with William J. Gedney's Western Nùng of Mường Khương, Lào Cai Province.
Nùng An is spoken in and around Quảng Uyên, Quảng Hòa District, Cao Bằng. Like the Long'an (隆安) speakers of Guangxi, it has a mixture of Northern and Central Tai features.
Nùng Giang is spoken in Hà Quảng District, Cao Bằng. It is also spoken across the border in Pingmeng (平孟镇), Jingxi County, Guangxi.

Nùng Vên (En), a language formerly undistinguished from surrounding Central Tai (Nùng) dialects, was discovered to be a Kra language by Hoàng Văn Ma and Jerold A. Edmondson in 1998. Its speakers are classified as Nùng by the Vietnamese government.

References

Freiberger, Nancy; Vy Thị Bé (1976a). Sẹc mạhn Slứ Nohng Fạn Slihng: Ngữ vựng Nùng Phạn Slinh (Nung Fan Slihng Vocabulary). Series 64 E72. Summer Institute of Linguistics (Viện Chuyên Khảo Ngữ Học).
Freiberger, Nancy (1976b). Thòi củ cưhn Nohng  Fạn Slihng: Phong tục tập quán của người Nùng Phạn Slinh (Culture and Folklore of the Nung Fan Slihng). Series 64 E16. Summer Institute of Linguistics (Viện Chuyên Khảo Ngữ Học), Mainland Southeast Asia Branch.
Vy Thị Bé; Janice E. Saul; Nancy Freiberger Wilson (1982). Nung Fan Slihng - English Dictionary. Manila: Summer Institute of Linguistics (Viện Chuyên Khảo Ngữ Học).

See also
Nong Zhuang language, spoken in China

Languages of Vietnam
Tai languages